Cinematix is the fifth solo album by Robby Krieger, former guitarist of The Doors. The album was released in 2000.

It contains War Toad, a re-mixed, jazz-rap infused version of The Doors' Peace Frog.

Track listing
"Snake Oil" - 4:41 
"Idolatry" - 4:52 
"Skip" - 4:12 
"Missionary Jam" - 10:23 
"Psychadelicate" - 7:56 
"Haunted Spouse" - 3:42 
"Red Alert" - 6:42 
"Brandino" - 5:05 
"Out of the Mood" - 7:57 
"War Toad" - 6:31

Personnel 
Robby Krieger - Guitar, synthesizer
Edgar Winter, Gary Meek - Saxophone
Arthur Barrow - Organ, bass
Dale Alexander, T. Lavitz - Keyboards
Kevin Brandon - Synthesizer, bass, drums
Jeff Richman - Guitar
Tony Newton, John Avila, Alphonso Johnson - Bass
Bruce Gary, Richie Hayward, Johnny Hernandez, Billy Cobham - Drums
Robbie Amar - Turntable

References 

2000 albums
Robby Krieger albums